Ariel Mangiantini (born 5 October 1971 in Zárate, Buenos Aires) is a former Argentine footballer who played as a forward for clubs of Argentina, Chile, Mexico, Bolivia, Ecuador and Italy.

Clubs
 Defensores Unidos 1992–1995
 Deportes Concepción 1995
 Saltillo 1996
 Lucchese 1996
 Defensores Unidos 1997
 Santiago Wanderers 1997
 General Lamadrid 1998
 Tristán Suárez 1999–2000
 Temperley 2000–2001
 Ferro Carril Oeste 2001–2002
 Deportivo Cuenca 2002
 Independiente Petrolero 2002
 Blooming 2003
 Ferro Carril Oeste 2003
 Real Potosí 2004
 Fénix 2005–2007

External links
 

1971 births
Living people
People from Zárate, Buenos Aires
Sportspeople from Buenos Aires Province
Argentine footballers
Association football forwards
Ferro Carril Oeste footballers
General Lamadrid footballers
Defensores Unidos footballers
C.D. Cuenca footballers
Club Blooming players
Club Real Potosí players
Santiago Wanderers footballers
Deportes Concepción (Chile) footballers
Club Atlético Fénix players
Chilean Primera División players
Argentine expatriate footballers
Argentine expatriate sportspeople in Chile
Expatriate footballers in Chile
Argentine expatriate sportspeople in Italy
Expatriate footballers in Italy
Argentine expatriate sportspeople in Mexico
Expatriate footballers in Mexico
Argentine expatriate sportspeople in Bolivia
Expatriate footballers in Bolivia
Argentine expatriate sportspeople in Ecuador
Expatriate footballers in Ecuador